Riedel's thyroiditis, is a chronic form of thyroiditis. It is now believed that Riedel's thyroiditis is one manifestation of a systemic disease that can affect many organ systems called IgG4-related disease. It is often a multi-organ disease affecting pancreas, liver, kidney, salivary and orbital tissues and retroperitoneum. The hallmarks of the disease are fibrosis and infiltration by IgG4 secreting plasma cells.

Signs and symptoms

Pathophysiology
Riedel's thyroiditis is characterized by a replacement of the normal thyroid parenchyma by a dense fibrosis that invades adjacent structures of the neck and extends beyond the thyroid capsule. This makes the thyroid gland stone-hard (woody) and fixed to adjacent structures. The inflammatory process infiltrates muscles and causes symptoms of tracheal compression. Surgical treatment is required to relieve tracheal or esophageal obstruction.

Diagnosis
It typically present as a painless, hard anterior neck mass, which progresses over weeks to years to produce symptoms of compression, including dysphagia, dyspnea choking and hoarseness. Patients may present with symptoms of hypothyroidism and hypoparathyroidism as the gland is replaced by Fibrous tissues . Physical examination reveals a hard "woody" thyroid gland with fixation to surrounding tissue. The diagnosis needs to be confirmed by open thyroid biopsy because the firm and Fibrous nature of the gland renders FNAB inadequate.

Treatment

Therapy usually consists of prednisolone, nonetheless some cases may require surgery. Tamoxifen has been proposed as part of a treatment plan.

Treatment is directed to surgical relief of compressive symptoms. Tamoxifen may also be beneficial. The type of surgery which is indicated here is isthmectomy.

Prevalence
Riedel's thyroiditis is classified as rare.  Most patients remain euthyroid, but approximately 30% of patients become hypothyroid and very few patients are hyperthyroid. It is most commonly seen in women.

Eponym
It is named for Bernhard Riedel. He first recognized the disease In 1883 and  published its description in 1896.

References

External links 

IgG4-related disease
Steroid-responsive inflammatory conditions
Thyroid disease